Nazis, Communists, Klansmen, and Others on the Fringe: Political Extremism in America is a 1992 book by John George and Laird Wilcox.  It is an examination of political extremism of both the far left and far right in the United States.

The authors attempt to summarize the pre-1960 historical background of American extremist movements, discuss conspiracy theories and their validity, offer their insight on what motivates extremists, and discuss a number of contemporary groups on the "far left" and "far right" based principally on their personal contacts with approximately six hundred individual extremists and the extremists' own writings.

It was published by Prometheus Books (Buffalo, New York) in 1992 as a 523-page hardcover.  In 1996, Prometheus Books (Amherst, New York) republished it as American Extremists: Militias, Supremacists, Klansmen, Communists and Others in a 443-page paperback.

Overview
The authors give the history of their personal interest in political extremism.  Recognizing their fallibility, and inability to claim "anything approaching complete objectivity", the authors attempted to "make an honest and diligent attempt to be fair and even-handed in our treatment of this subject."  Distinguishing this book from the many covering "extremism" or "extremists" on the market (with their own agenda "to provide a rationale for persecuting or doing away with certain 'extremists'"), the authors' goal was "to provide understanding of a human problem, not a basis for one more round of persecutions."  The authors propose a definition of "extremism" based on "the behavioral model" ("defined in terms of certain behaviors, particularly behavior toward other human beings"), passing up the "normative or "statistical" way" (framing the spectrum on a linear scale, a "bell curve") and the "popularity contest" theory ("social definition agreed upon by collective fiat").   The authors describe their position on the political spectrum as "a bit difficult to pin down"; they "might be most accurately described as pragmatists with libertarian tendencies."

Organization 
 Preface
 Part I.  Background, Characteristics, Motivations, and Other Considerations
 Chapter 1.  It's Not New: Historical Perspective on American Extremism Prior to 1960
 Chapter 2.  What Is Extremism? Style and Tactics Matter More Than Goals
 Chapter 3.  Extremists and the Constitution
 Chapter 4.  Motivations: Why They Join, Stay, Leave
 Part II.  The Far Left
 Chapter 5.  Communist Party USA
 Chapter 6.  Socialist Workers Party
 Chapter 7.  Spartacist League
 Chapter 8.  Workers League
 Chapter 9.  The Guardian
 Chapter 10.  Black Panther Party
 Chapter 11.  Students for a Democratic Society
 Chapter 12.  Progressive Labor Party
 Chapter 13.  Workers World Party
 Chapter 14.  Communist Party USA (Marxist–Leninist)
 Chapter 15.  Revolutionary Action Movement
 Chapter 16.  Revolutionary Communist Party
 Chapter 17.  Communist Workers Party
 Chapter 18.  All-African People's Revolutionary Party
 Chapter 19.  Marxist–Leninist Party, USA
 Part III.  The Far Right' Chapter 20.  Reverend Billy James Hargis and his Christian Crusade
 Chapter 21.  The John Birch Society: A Plot to Sell Books?
 Chapter 22.  The Dan Smoot Report Chapter 23.  "Life Line"
 Chapter 24.  The Church League of America
 Chapter 25.  The Christian Right
 Chapter 26.  Willis Carto and Liberty Lobby
 Chapter 27.  The Citizens' Councils of America and The Councilor Chapter 28.  Robert Bolivar DePugh and the Minutemen
 Chapter 29.  Common Sense Chapter 30.  Gerald L. K. Smith and Christian Nationalist Crusade
 Chapter 31.  The LaRouche Network
 Chapter 32.  Jewish Defense League
 Chapter 33.  The Nation of Islam
 Chapter 34.  Assorted Neo-Nazis
 National Renaissance Party
 American Nazi Party
 National Socialist Party of America
  Neo-Nazi splinters and sects like
 America First Committee
 American White Nationalist Party
 Euro-American Alliance
 National Alliance
 National Democratic Front
 National Socialist League/World Service
 National Socialist Liberation Front
 National Socialist Movement
 National Socialist Vanguard
 National Socialist White America Party
 NSDAP/AO
 National Socialist White Workers Party
 the Social Nationalist Aryan Peoples Party
 SS Action Group,
 United White Peoples Party
  major groups of the 1980s like Aryan Nations
 The Mountain Church of Jesus Christ
 The Order
 Posse Comitatus
 White Aryan Resistance
 Chapter 35.  The National States' Rights Party
 Chapter 36.  National Christian Publishers
 Chapter 37.  Ku Klux Klans
 Appendix I.  Fake Quotes and Fabricated Documents: A Common Extremist Tactic
 Appendix II.  Principal Characteristics of the Extremes and the Mainstream in America: A Handy Guide for Extremist Watchers
 Index

External links
 American Extremists at the publisher's website.
 America's Homegrown Extremists – slideshow by Life magazine''

1992 non-fiction books
American political books
Prometheus Books books